Checkered Flag is a 1990 made-for-television film by John Glen and Michael Levine.

Plot 
Race car driver Mike Reardon and mechanic Tommy Trehearn are the best of friends whose friendship is damaged, however, when Reardon's girlfriend Chris ends up falling for Trehearn. Years later, Trehearn and Chris are married with children and move to Arizona when Trehearn is selected to be a mechanic for a new racing team, of which Reardon also happens to be a part.

Cast 
 Billy Campbell as Tommy Trehearn
 Rob Estes as Mike Reardon
 Amanda Wyss as Chris
 Robert Forster as Jack Cotton
 Pernell Roberts as Andrew Valiant

Production and release 
The film was produced as a TV pilot but was not picked up for a series. Sometime after its TV premiere, it was released on videocassette in Canada by Malofilm, and in 1993 in the United States by Rhino Home Video. No plans have been made to release this film onto DVD.

The film is rated R16 in New Zealand for violence, offensive language and sex scenes.

References

External links 
 
 
 

1990 films
Films directed by John Glen
1990 drama films
American auto racing films
Television pilots not picked up as a series
New World Pictures films
Films set in Arizona
1990s English-language films
1990s American films